Charles Harry Finlayson Methven is a public relations consultant, journalist and publisher, who has also been a football club executive, most recently at Sunderland AFC, where he was a part-owner.

Early life and education
Methven was  born in  June 1976 & brought up largely in rural Oxfordshire and went to Eton College. He went on to read Theology at Exeter College, Oxford.

Career

Journalism

In 1997, he started his career as a journalist for the horseracing paper Sporting Life, and later transferred to The Daily Telegraph, where he went on to edit the Peterborough diary column before being given his own column in 2003. He also wrote features and leaders for The Telegraph, and The Spectator, during this time.
In 2002, he was elected the Telegraph Group's ‘Father of the Chapel’ (the term used to denote a Shop Steward of the National Union of Journalists). During a subsequent dispute with management, the Telegraph's NUJ Chapel, led by Methven, went on to pass the first national newspaper strike ballot in over a decade. The dispute was settled afterward, but Methven left The Telegraph to join the London Evening Standard in 2004, as a feature writer.

Publisher

In 2005, in a consortium that included former Daily Telegraph Director Jeremy Deedes, Methven founded a daily horseracing and gambling newspaper titled The Sportsman; it was the UK's first new nationally distributed newspaper since The Independent in 1986. While the paper reached a circulation of over 20,000 copies a day, it ran out of funds in late 2006 and folded.

Public relations  

In 2011, he co-founded a communications consultancy called Dragon Associates which has advised clients such as the Kingdom of Bahrain. Other clients included 5 Hertford Street, Tottenham Hotspur, and Marex Spectron In 2017, Spear's Wealth Management Survey rated him among the top-10 public relations consultants in London in their annual rankings.

Football clubs

Oxford United F.C.

A life-long supporter of Oxford United, Methven became a founding committee member of Oxford's supporters' trust, OxVox. In 2011, he became a Trustee of OUFC's Youth and Community Trust, founded supporters group the Yellow Army and also gave marketing and PR advice to the club's then owner Ian Lenagan, until Lenagan sold Oxford in 2014. Methven had launched an attempt to buy the club with subsequent business partner Stewart Donald, but was outbid.

Sunderland A.F.C.

In May 2018, Methven arranged for Juan Sartori and Stewart Donald to buy Sunderland from American billionaire Ellis Short. Methven bought 6% of the club and was appointed as its Executive Director. The takeover is featured in Episode 8 of Netflix documentary Sunderland 'Til I Die: A Fresh Start. Prior to SAFC's acquisition by Donald, Sartori, and Methven it had been relegated twice consecutively and was £160 million in debt and losing over £20 million per annum. The club had been expected by many industry experts to be on the brink of administration.

Under his marketing guidance, the club achieved the highest-ever season average attendance for the 3rd tier of English football (31,500), the highest single-match attendance for League 1 (46,039 vs Bradford City on Boxing Day 2018) and the highest revenues in League 1 history. SAFC also received Football Business’ Marketing Award for season 2018/2019 for the club's ‘Big Seat Change’ initiative and was nominated by the Football Supporters Association for their Best Fan Engagement award.
However, he also ran into trouble with fan groups on a number of occasions. In a BBC Radio Newcastle interview in September 2018, he described Sunderland fans who chose to watch illegal live streams in pubs adjoining the stadium instead of paying to watch matches as ‘parasites’, a word he subsequently described as "ill-chosen". Over a year later, he was the subject of a leak from a private meeting with fans group leaders at a meeting to clarify what they were concerned might have been a misleading statement made by him to the press.  He explained to The Times, who published the leak, that he had "felt exasperated" by the negative reaction to something he regarded as good news and had reacted "intemperately".

Following the leaked account of the private meeting by The Times, Methven said he had already given notice of his resignation from Sunderland's Board, eventually stepping down in December 2019 citing the pressures of business and family life. He explained in a statement that his wife was in the latter stages of pregnancy and that his consultancy clients expected him to be in London more often in 2020. He continued as a shareholder of the club, and as a director of its holding company, Madrox Partners Limited.

References 

Living people
People educated at Eton College
Alumni of Exeter College, Oxford
1976 births
English football chairmen and investors
English public relations people
English journalists
Sunderland A.F.C. directors and chairmen
People from Oxfordshire